Rotundaria aurea, the golden orb, is a species of freshwater mussel. It is native to the United States, where it is found only in Texas.

This species was moved from Quadrula to Rotundaria based on genetic evidence in 2012.

References

External links
federalregister.gov: Texas-fatmucket/Golden orb — Quadrula aurea

aurea
Endemic fauna of the United States
Natural history of Texas
Bivalves described in 1859